Paul William Runge is a former professional baseball player. He played all or part of eight seasons in Major League Baseball for the Atlanta Braves from  until . He currently serves as a manager of the Florida Fire Frogs, the Atlanta Braves' Class-A affiliate in the Florida State League.

Early life
Runge graduated from Kingston High School in 1976.

Baseball career

As a player
Runge was drafted by the Braves in the ninth round of the 1979 Major League Baseball Draft and spent his entire major league career with them, playing parts of eight seasons in the majors. Runge was a utility infielder, splitting his time between third base, shortstop, and second base. Throughout those seasons, he never played in more than 52 games, nor did he come to bat more than 110 times.

As a coach
Since , Runge has been a manager at various levels of the Braves organization. In November 2010, it was announced that Runge would be managing the Rome Braves. However, he instead chose to leave the Braves organization to join the Astros.

Notes

Sources

1958 births
Living people
Atlanta Braves players
Baseball players from New York (state)
Durham Bulls managers
Durham Bulls players
Eugene Emeralds managers
Jacksonville Dolphins baseball players
Kingsport Braves players
Las Vegas Stars (baseball) players
Major League Baseball infielders
Sportspeople from Kingston, New York
Richmond Braves players
Savannah Braves players
Syracuse Chiefs players